The 1995 MAC men's basketball tournament, a part of the 1994–95 NCAA Division I men's basketball season, took place at Savage Arena in Toledo, Ohio. Its winner received the Mid-American Conference's automatic bid to the 1995 NCAA tournament. It was a single-elimination tournament with three rounds and the top eight MAC teams invited to participate. No teams received byes in the tournament. Miami received the number one seed in the tournament.

Tournament

Seeds
 Miami
 Ohio
 Eastern Michigan
 Ball State
 Bowling Green
 Toledo
 Western Michigan
 Kent State

Bracket 

* Overtime period

References

Tournament
MAC men's basketball tournament
Mid-American Conference men's basketball tournament